Timocratica palpalis is a moth of the family Depressariidae. It is found in Brazil (Espirito Santo, Bahia, Distrito Federal, Rio de Janeiro, Minas Gerais, Paraná, Rio Grande do Sul, Santa Catarina, São Paulo), Bolivia and Argentina.

The wingspan is 56–60 mm. The forewings and hindwings are white, beneath with broad yellow-ochreous costal bands, sometimes some grey suffusion at the apex of the forewings.

Food
The larvae feed on the bark of 
 
  Acer saccharinum
  Acer platanoides
  Casuarina equisetifolia
  Belangera tomentosa
  Diospyros kaki
  Castanea sativa
  Quercus robus
  Persea americana
  Pleroma urvilleanum
  Tibouchina candolleiana
  Calycorectes pohlianus
  Campomanesia acida
  Eucalyptus alba
  Eucalyptus camaldulensis
  Eucalyptus ciriodora
  Eucalyptus saligna
  Eucalyptus tereticornis
  Eugenia brasiliensis
  Eugenia uniflora
  Eugenia involucrata
  Hexachlamyx edulis
  Marlierea tomentosa
  Myrcia fenzliana
  Myrciaria trunciflora
  Psidium guajava
  Psidium quineense
  Psidium humile
  Syzygium jambos
  Syzygium malaccense
  Platanus orientalis
  Macadamia ternifolia
  Punica granatum
  Cydonia vulgaris
  Eriobotrya japonica
  Malus domestica
  Malus sylvestris
  Prunus amygdalus
  Prunus armeniaca
  Prunus domestica
  Prunus persica
  Pyrus communis
  Pyrus sinensis
  Coffea arabica
  Salix viminalis
  Luehea divaricata 
  Ulmus americana

References

Moths described in 1877
Timocratica